Sikhs in China are a religious minority in the People's Republic of China. Sikhism originated from the Punjab region of northern India.

History

Guru Nanak is traditionally locally referred to as Baba Foosa in China proper and as Nanak Lama in Tibet. During the 1800s and 1900s, many Sikh Punjabi people were recruited from British India to work as officers for the Shanghai Municipal Police and Hong Kong Police. Recruitment of Sikhs in SMP began in 1885 from Punjab. By 1920 there were 573 policemen in Sikh branch. The Old Sikh Gurdwara at 326 Dong Baoxing Road was opened in 1908. Rabindra Nath Tagore visited Shanghai Gurdwara during his 1924 visit, which is in background on the image given. By 1930s and 1940s the exodus of Sikhs began after World War I during 1911–14, when some Sikhs openly supported Japanese and joined INA of Subhash Chander Bose. The SMP was disbanded in 1945. Many Sikhs had settled permanently in China and made marriages there. The last Sikhs left Shanghai in 1973 after the Sino-India conflict in 1962.

Gurdwara

There are a small number of gurdwara (Sikh temples) in China:

Gurdwara Shanghai - Shanghai
Khalsa Diwan - Hong Kong

Presently there are about nearly 100 Sikh families in mainland China. They are running a private Gurdwara in house of some Sikh follower.

Apart from mainland China, many Sikh businessmen and Indians also reside in Hong Kong.

Road Name Change 
A road which during  the British regime had name Sikh Church Road or Sikh Gurdwara Road has its name changed as Guangxi North Road . As per text of a Chinese site “ In the British Concession, most of the first names of roads are transliterated or translated in English. The transliteration includes Kuanke Road (now the eastern section of Ningbo Road), which is the transliteration of kirk's, which means Scottish Church Avenue; Sikh Road (now Guangxi North Road) is the transliteration of Sikh, which means Sikh Church Road;”

References

Religion in China
China
Sikhism in Asia